Burrendong was an electoral district of Legislative Assembly of the Australian state of New South Wales, created in 1968, partly replacing Mudgee and named after the Burrendong Dam. It was abolished in 1981.

Members for Burrendong

Election results

References

Former electoral districts of New South Wales
Constituencies established in 1968
1968 establishments in Australia
Constituencies disestablished in 1981
1981 disestablishments in Australia